Richmond Field  is a privately owned, public use airport located two nautical miles (4 km) southeast of the central business district of Gregory, a city in Livingston County, Michigan, United States.

Facilities and aircraft 
Richmond Field covers an area of 145 acres (59 ha) at an elevation of 921 feet (281 m) above mean sea level. It has one runway designated 18/36 with a turf surface measuring 2,471 by 100 feet (753 x 30 m).

For the 12-month period ending December 31, 2021, the airport had 6,552 general aviation aircraft operations, an average of 18 per day. At that time there were 36 aircraft based at this airport: 32 gliders and 4 single-engine airplanes.

Accidents and incidents 

 On December 14, 2006, a Schleicher AS-K13 contacted trees while on final approach to land. The pilot reported that when he entered the traffic pattern he noticed the wind sock was shifting and the glider was losing altitude at a rate that was faster than the previous flight. He stated that because of this, he turned onto base leg sooner than normal. He reported, "Upon turning there was an immediate sense of an inability to penetrate thru the airmass as the glider continued to lose altitude." He stated he lowered the nose of the glider in an attempt to gain airspeed and flew an abbreviated base leg, heading straight for the runway. The pilot reported he then noted a shift in the wind and the glider descended into the 75 foot tall trees northeast of the approach end of the runway. The probable cause was found to be the pilot's unexpected encounter with wind shear and his inability to remain clear of the trees while on final approach to land.
 On May 10, 2008, a Schleicher AS-K13 was involved in an accident after takeoff from Richmond Field. The glider became airborne from the towplane and was consistently flying higher than it needed to be. After releasing from the towline, the glider resumed a level pitch attitude and began to decelerate. The pilot selected full nose down trim, in response to his limited pitch control. The glider continued to decelerate and subsequently landed hard on the turf runway. The main landing gear and aft fuselage tubular support structure was substantially damaged during the hard landing. Both wingtips were damaged and there were several fabric tears on the left wing and fuselage. After exiting the glider, the pilot found his handheld communication radio on the cockpit floor. The pilot said that during takeoff the radio must have fell off his seat onto the cockpit floor, restricting the movement of the control stick. The probable cause was found to be the pilot's failure to adequately secure his handheld radio prior to takeoff, which resulted in a restriction of the flight control stick and loss of control.
 On July 29, 2012, an experimental Smith Applebay Zuni II glider sustained substantial damage when it impacted trees and terrain while on the downwind leg to runway 36 at the Richmond Field Airport. The pilot had just departed and was unable to find the necessary lift to complete the flight, and even after he joined the downwind leg to land at the airport, he still could not find the needed lift. A witness located at the airport reported that he observed the glider on the downwind leg. He reported that the glider's altitude was low – about 125 to 150 feet agl, and it was in close to the airport and flying "somewhat slowly." The glider seemed to slow down even more as it began to turn to the base leg. He reported that the left wing stalled and the glider pitched down nearly vertical. It completed about 1/2 spin before it disappeared behind the trees about 2,000 feet away. The probable cause was found to be the glider pilot’s failure to maintain sufficient altitude and airspeed while turning to the base leg of the traffic pattern, which resulted in a stall/spin and impact with trees and terrain.

References

External links 
 Richmond Field (69G) at Michigan DOT Airport Directory
 Aerial image as of April 1998 from USGS The National Map

Airports in Michigan
Transportation in Livingston County, Michigan